D. Scott Phoenix is an American entrepreneur and cofounder of Vicarious, an artificial intelligence research company.

Career

In 2007, Phoenix graduated from the University of Pennsylvania with a Bachelor of Applied Science in Computer Science and Entrepreneurship. After graduation, Phoenix started a company through the Y Combinator program, and later joined venture capital firm Founders Fund as Entrepreneur in Residence. In 2010, Phoenix co-founded Vicarious with neuroscientist and AI researcher Dileep George. He is an advocate for the development of safe AI, and a leading signatory on the Future of Life Institute's Open Letter on Artificial Intelligence and the Asilomar AI Principles. In 2016, he predicted that by 2031 the fastest computing system would perform more operations per second than the number of neocortical neurons in all human brains alive at the time of the quote (on the order of 10^20 FLOPS, or 100 exaflops).

Phoenix is interviewed in the 2018 AI documentary Do You Trust This Computer? and the 2020 AI documentary MACHINE.

References

University of Pennsylvania School of Engineering and Applied Science alumni
American company founders
1982 births
Living people